Kennedy is a fictional character in the television series Buffy the Vampire Slayer. Portrayed by Iyari Limon in the TV series, the character was introduced in the final season of the series and goes on to appear in the comic book series Buffy the Vampire Slayer Season Eight which continues the story of the television series.
 	
Kennedy is introduced as a "potential Slayer", one of many girls who might become endowed with supernatural abilities, destined to battle evil creatures such as vampires and demons, like protagonist Buffy Summers. Distinctly, Kennedy is also a love interest for Willow Rosenberg; Kennedy is an out lesbian with an assertive personality, which is intended to contrast with the shyness of Willow's deceased girlfriend, Tara. In the series finale of Buffy, Willow magically activates the potential in all girls like Kennedy to become full-fledged Slayers, like Buffy. Entertainment Weekly named her one of the "21 Most Annoying TV Characters Ever".

Appearances

Television
Kennedy only appears in the seventh season of the television series. Kennedy is one of the first three Potential Slayers to arrive in Sunnydale. She comes from a wealthy family in New York City and has at least one sibling - a half-sister. An out lesbian, Kennedy has known about her sexuality since the age of five (commenting that she found out watching Gone with the Wind). Kennedy is immediately interested in having a romantic relationship with Willow when the two meet in the season seven episode, "Bring on the Night".

Kennedy witnessed her Watcher's death; he was murdered by Bringers, the lackeys of The First Evil. That she knew about Watchers (as well as having some comprehension of how the Slayer line works) before being chosen indicates that she was approached by them at some point during her youth, like the late Slayer, Kendra Young.

Kennedy becomes Willow's lover before she completely comprehends Willow's magical prowess and how Willow operates as a witch. In the episode "Get It Done", she gains a first-hand understanding when Willow drains a significant portion of her life force in order to reopen a portal for Buffy. This briefly puts a strain on their relationship, but they eventually reconcile.

Kennedy becomes one of the more prominent Potentials, overseeing their training in "Get It Done", and giving orders to them in "End of Days" while Buffy is absent and Faith is incapacitated. She supports Willow in her attempt to activate all Potential Slayers. After Willow's activation spell is completed, Kennedy joins Buffy and the other Potentials in the final battle against the First Evil's army of Turok-Han as a fully activated Slayer.

In Season Five of Angel, a year after the end of Buffy, mention is made that Kennedy and Willow are living in Brazil together.

Literature

Kennedy continues to appear in literary follow-ups to the television series. In Buffy the Vampire Slayer Season Eight (2007–11), an in-canon comic book series, in the story titled "The Long Way Home, Part III", Buffy catches up with Willow in Scotland, after the latter's year long absence. During this conversation, Buffy asks how Kennedy's doing and Willow reveals that she died, though it was only a short-lived mystical death. However, it still freaked Kennedy out and caused her to slow things down in her and Willow's relationship. In the issue "Anywhere but Here", a flashback recounts a conversation that reveals that Kennedy is worried that Willow keeps her away from Buffy's inner circle because she is ashamed of her. Willow promptly explains that she blames herself for Tara's death because she kept her close to Buffy and therefore to danger. Willow then states that she refuses to let that happen to Kennedy. In Season Eight, Kennedy directs an army of slayers in New York, along with Vi. She and Willow finally reunite in the fourth arc of the series, "Time of Your Life", in which Buffy is accidentally sent to the future and Kennedy is helping Willow in an attempt to bring her back. Over the course of the series, Willow remains distant from Kennedy, in part because she is having a sexual relationship with her magical mentor, the demon Aluwyn (a.k.a. Saga Vasuki). Kennedy antagonizes Buffy when she learns of Buffy's lesbian affair with the Slayer Satsu, in part fearful Buffy is in fact gay and will pursue Willow, and later helps Satsu get over Buffy. It becomes clear that Buffy is only experimenting and will not pursue a relationship with Willow. In "Retreat", Kennedy and her unit are forced to regroup with Buffy's main unit as the Big Bad, Twilight, closes in on them. She fights alongside the main Scoobies up until the finale "Last Gleaming". In its aftermath, after Buffy's actions have brought about the end of magic, Kennedy is dumped by Willow, who is in a personal tailspin after the loss of her powers and her connection to Aluwyn.

In Buffy the Vampire Slayer Season Nine (2011–2013), Kennedy first appears in the "Guarded" story arc where it was revealed that since the disbandment of Buffy's Slayer organization, Kennedy has established a private security firm employing Slayers to protect its high-profile clients. Buffy joins Kennedy's organization, and before long it becomes apparent that their client—a social network founder and Internet billionaire—is on the run from the demonic law firm Wolfram & Hart, who funded his website's development and plan to use it to return from their extradimensional exile. Buffy and Kennedy defeat the threat and shut down the site, and though Buffy quits the job, Kennedy pays her handsomely for her services. Kennedy's company has made her a millionaire and she sends Buffy a private jet so the trio of Buffy, Xander and Willow are able to fly from San Francisco to the Deeper Well in England in an effort to save Dawn's life. At the conclusion of the Season Nine companion series Angel & Faith, Faith leaves Angel in an effort to find her own direction in life and mentions Kennedy offered her a job as a trainer for the Slayer bodyguards. Kennedy next appears on a recurring basis in the second volume of Angel & Faith (2014–), as well as in crossover scenes in the first two issues of Buffy Season Ten. In the first arc, "Where the River Meets the Sea," she attempts to smooth out Faith's rough edges and help her new recruit adjust to life on the payroll, but not without difficulty—both from younger Slayers who resent Faith, and by the difficulty Faith has with the business taking on demons as clients. As Faith is about to quit, however, Kennedy offers her a mission she can't resist: to find Riley Finn, who has gone missing in South America. After leading a team to successfully to save Riley, his wife Sam and the woman Reese Zane who runs a pharmaceutical company, Faith quits Deepscan to work for Reese. Reese is starting to look at the ways magic altered the humans in London's new Magic Town ghetto, taking Faith back to Angel. Later on in the Buffy title, it is mentioned Deepscan has partnered with the human military to help battle the global threat of demon invasions.

See also
List of minor Buffy the Vampire Slayer characters
Woman warrior
List of women warriors in folklore

References

External links
 Vyra.net

American female characters in television
Buffy the Vampire Slayer characters
Fictional bodyguards
Fictional characters from New York City
Fictional female businesspeople
Fictional LGBT characters in television
Fictional lesbians
LGBT characters in comics
Slayers (Buffyverse)
Television characters introduced in 2002